The Soviet Cup was the national ice hockey cup competition in the Soviet Union.

Champions
1989 Krylya Sovetov Moscow
1988 CSKA Moscow
1979 CSKA Moscow
1977 CSKA Moscow
1976 Dynamo Moscow
1974 Krylya Sovetov Moscow
1973 CSKA Moscow
1972 Dynamo Moscow
1971 Spartak Moscow
1970 Spartak Moscow
1969 CSKA Moscow
1968 CSKA Moscow
1967 CSKA Moscow
1966 CSKA Moscow
1961 CSKA Moscow
1956 CSKA Moscow
1955 CSKA Moscow
1954 CSKA Moscow
1953 Dynamo Moscow
1952 VVS Moscow
1951 Krylya Sovetov Moscow

Titles by team

See also 
Soviet Hockey Championship
Russian Open Hockey Championship
Russian Elite Hockey Scoring Champion
Russian Elite Hockey Goal Scoring Champion
Soviet MVP (ice hockey)
Super Series

External links
 Soviet Cup on hockeyarchives.ru

 
Ice hockey competitions in the Soviet Union
Defunct national ice hockey cup competitions in Europe